The Edgewater Casino is a former casino that was located at 760 Pacific Blvd South Vancouver, British Columbia.  It was in operation from 2005 to 2017.

History
The Edgwater Casino opened in February 2005.
In 2006, the casino was acquired by Paragon Gaming who would manage it for more than ten years. In September 2006, the company purchased the bankrupt casino for $43 million.

The casino was closed on  September 29, 2017. This was the same day that across the street, the Parq Vancouver opened its doors.

Statistics
In 2013, it generated $6.6 million for the city. In 2014 it was $7.2 million. In 2015, it was $8.3 million and 2016 it was $8.6 million.

At one stage, the casino was the only licensed venue of its type in the city.

Events
The Casino was well known for its hosting of live events. The 2016 Karaoke World Championships were held at the casino.  The competition ran from the 1st of November to the 6th. 

The Canada International Film Festival is an annual event that had been hosted by the casino since 2009. In 2014, it was held from March 28-29.

References

Casinos in British Columbia
2005 establishments in British Columbia
2017 disestablishments in British Columbia
Casinos completed in 2005
Buildings and structures in Vancouver
Defunct casinos in Canada